The Capitale Junior AA Hockey League is a Canadian junior ice hockey league in the Province of Quebec, Canada.  The league is sanctioned by Hockey Quebec and Hockey Canada.  Annually, the champion of the league competes for the Coupe Dodge.

Teams

Champions
2006 Québec-Ouest Gouverneurs
2007 Charlesbourg Elans
2008 Frontenac
2009 Beauport Harfangs
2010 Beauport Harfangs
2011 Québec-Ouest Ambassadeurs
2012 Québec-Ouest Ambassadeurs
2013 Québec-Ouest Gouverneurs
2014 Frontenac
2015 Québec-Ouest Gouverneurs
2016 Frontenac
2017 Quebec-Centre Maurice
2018 CRSA Noroits

External links
Capitale Junior "AA" Website
Quebec-Ouest Website

B
B
Organizations based in Quebec City
Hockey Quebec